Jorge Henao (born 25 November 1941) is a Colombian former sports shooter. He competed in the 50 metre pistol event at the 1972 Summer Olympics.

References

1941 births
Living people
Colombian male sport shooters
Olympic shooters of Colombia
Shooters at the 1972 Summer Olympics
Place of birth missing (living people)